Bonifacio Custodio (born November 30, 1982) is a Filipino professional basketball player for the Davao Occidental Tigers of the Pilipinas Super League (PSL). He was drafted 8th overall by the San Miguel Beermen during the 2008 PBA draft.

References

Living people
1982 births
Alaska Aces (PBA) players
Air21 Express players
Barako Bull Energy players
Basketball players from Leyte (province)
Filipino men's basketball players
Maharlika Pilipinas Basketball League players
NorthPort Batang Pier players
San Miguel Beermen draft picks
San Miguel Beermen players
Shooting guards
Sta. Lucia Realtors players
UE Red Warriors basketball players